Taisha Abelar, born Maryann Simko, was an American writer and anthropologist who was an associate of Carlos Castaneda.

Biography
Abelar met Castaneda when she was 19 years old and a student at University of California, Los Angeles where she eventually earned her master's degree and PhD in Anthropology. In 1973, Castaneda purchased a compound on Pandora Avenue in Westwood, Los Angeles, and soon after Abelar (she was still known as Maryann Simko at this time), along with Regine Thal and Kathleen Pohlman, who would come to be known collectively as "the witches", moved in. In 1974, Samurai magazine published photos of Regine Thal doing karate exercises. In the article, Abelar is called "Anna Marie Carter".

In keeping with Castaneda's philosophy of "erasing personal history", the witches maintained a tight veil of secrecy. They used numerous aliases and generally did not allow themselves to be photographed. Not long after moving into Castaneda's compound Maryann Simko changed her name to Taisha Abelar. Likewise, Regine Thal changed her name to Florinda Donner and Kathleen Pohlman to Carol Tiggs.

Abelar claimed to have been one of Don Juan’s four students and says she spent a year in his "magical house" in Mexico. In 1992, her book The Sorcerer's Crossing: A Woman’s Journey, which documents the training she received from the female members of don Juan's group, was published by Viking Books.

Through the 1990s, Abelar and the other witches started giving workshops in Tensegrity for Cleargreen Incorporated, a company formed by Castaneda for that purpose.

Disappearance
In April 1998 – shortly after Castaneda's death – Abelar disappeared, together with four other close associates of Castaneda (Florinda Donner, Amalia Marquez (also known as Talia Bey), Kylie Lundahl, and Patricia Lee Partin). Partin's sun-bleached skeleton was discovered in Death Valley by hikers in 2003. No trace of the other four women has been found.

See also
List of people who disappeared

Bibliography

Notes

References

1990s missing person cases
20th-century American scientists
20th-century American women scientists
20th-century American writers
20th-century American women writers
20th-century American anthropologists
American spiritual writers
American women anthropologists
American women non-fiction writers
Missing people
Missing person cases in California
New Age writers
University of California, Los Angeles alumni
Writers from Los Angeles
Year of birth missing